The 2014 Iranian Futsal 2nd Division will be divided into two phases.

The league will also be composed of 20 teams divided into Three divisions. Two divisions of 7 teams each and one division 6 teams, whose teams will be divided geographically. Teams will play only other teams in their own division, once at home and once away for a total of 18 matches each.

Teams

Group A

Group B

Group C 

Notes
1 Cut Shahrud renamed Peyman Shahrud.
2 Milad Nor renamed Esteghlal Sahand.

Number of teams by region

Standings

Group A

Group B

Group C

Main round

See also 
 2013–14 Iranian Futsal Super League
 2013–14 Futsal 1st Division
 2013–14 Futsal Hazfi Cup
 2013–14 Persian Gulf Cup
 2013–14 Azadegan League
 2013–14 Iran Football's 2nd Division
 2013–14 Iran Football's 3rd Division
 2013–14 Hazfi Cup

References 

Iran Futsal's 2nd Division seasons
3
3